String Quartet No. 7 may refer to:

 String Quartet No. 7 (Beethoven) by Ludwig van Beethoven
 String Quartet No. 7 (Diamond) by David Diamond
 String Quartet No. 7 (Dvořák) by Antonín Dvořák
 String Quartet No. 7 (Halffter), Espacio de silencio by Cristóbal Halffter
 String Quartet No. 7 (Hill) by Alfred Hill
 String Quartet No. 7 (McCabe), Summer Eves, by John McCabe
 String Quartet No. 7 (Maconchy) by Elizabeth Maconchy
 String Quartet No. 7 (Milhaud), Op. 87, by Darius Milhaud
 String Quartet No. 7 (Mozart) by Wolfgang Amadeus Mozart
 String Quartet No. 7 (Porter) by Quincy Porter
 String Quartet No. 7 (Rihm) by Wolfgang Rihm
 String Quartet No. 7 (Schubert) by Franz Schubert
 String Quartet No. 7 (Shostakovich) by Dmitri Shostakovich
 String Quartet No. 7 (Simpson) by Robert Simpson
 String Quartet No. 7 (Spohr) by Louis Spohr
 String Quartet No. 7 (Villa-Lobos) by Heitor Villa-Lobos